Keni may refer to:

Geography and language
Kenis (Persian: كنيس) a village in Panjak-e Rastaq Rural District, Iran
Rombo language (redirect from Keni dialect)
Central Kilimanjaro language (redirect from Keni language), a Bantu language of Tanzania spoken by the Chaga people

Film and TV
KENI AM 650, a radio station in Anchorage, Alaska
KENI Radio Building Art Moderne building in Anchorage, Alaska
Keni (film) a 1982 Indian Malayalam film, directed by J. Sasikumar
Keni or Kinar (film), a 2018 Indian film, directed by M. A. Nishad

People
Keni Styles, a British former pornographic actor of Thai origin
Keni Liptzin (1863–1916), actress in the early years of Yiddish theater
Keni Burke (1953), American singer
Jenny Keni (1982), a sprinter from the Solomon Islands
Keni Doidoi (1976), an association football player from Fiji
Keni Thomas, American country music singer
Paul Kenis (1885–1934), Flemish writer
Keni Dakuidreketi, Fijian politician